Histone-binding protein RBBP7 is a protein that in humans is encoded by the RBBP7 gene.

Function 

This protein is a ubiquitously expressed nuclear protein and belongs to a highly conserved subfamily of WD-repeat proteins. It is found among several proteins that binds directly to retinoblastoma protein, which regulates cell proliferation. The encoded protein is found in many histone deacetylase complexes, including mSin3 co-repressor complex. It is also present in protein complexes involved in chromatin assembly. This protein can interact with BRCA1 tumor-suppressor gene and may have a role in the regulation of cell proliferation and differentiation.

Model organisms

Model organisms have been used in the study of RBBP7 function. A conditional knockout mouse line, called Rbbp7tm1a(EUCOMM)Wtsi was generated as part of the International Knockout Mouse Consortium program — a high-throughput mutagenesis project to generate and distribute animal models of disease to interested scientists.

Male and female animals underwent a standardized phenotypic screen to determine the effects of deletion. Twenty one tests were carried out on mutant mice and one significant abnormality was observed: hemizygous mutant males had decreased CD4-positive and CD8-positive T cell numbers.

Interactions 

RBBP7 has been shown to interact with:

 BRCA1,
 GATAD2B, 
 HDAC1, 
 MTA2, 
 Retinoblastoma protein, 
 SAP30,  and
 SIN3A.

References

Further reading 

 
 
 
 
 
 
 
 
 
 
 
 
 
 
 
 
 
 
 

Genes mutated in mice